Mr. Jones is the 35th studio album by Welsh musician Tom Jones. It was released in 2002 by V2 Records.

Track listing
 "Tom Jones International" (3:19)
Written by Jerry Wonder Duplessis, Wyclef Jean and Tom Jones
Backing vocals: Governor Washington, Melkie Jean
"Younger Days" (5:23)
Written by Jerry Wonder Duplessis, Wyclef Jean and Tom Jones
Saxophone: Robert Aaron
"Holiday" (3:29)
Written by Jerry Wonder Duplessis, Wyclef Jean and Tom Jones
Keyboards: Teflon
"Whatever It Takes" (3:59)
Written by Jerry Wonder Duplessis, Wyclef Jean and Tom Jones
"Heaven's Been a Long Time Coming" (3:26)
Written by Jerry Wonder Duplessis and Wyclef Jean
Vocals: Curtis King, Dennis Collins, Alfonso Thornton, Ken Williams
Written by Anne Stokes, Jim Sells, Mark T. Jordan
"Black Betty" (3:10)
Guitar: Keith Airey
Written by Huddie Ledbetter
"Jezebel" (3:58)
Written by Tom Jones, Wyclef Jean and Jerry Wonder Duplessis
Saxophone: Robert Aaron
Trombone, arranged by Clark Gayton
Trumpet: John Walsh, Raul Agraz
"The Letter" (3:48)
Written by Tom Jones, Wyclef Jean and Jerry Wonder Duplessis
Backing vocals: Alfonso Thornton, Curtis King, Dennis Collins, Shelton Becton
Vocals: Allure
"This Is My Life" (3:30)
Written by Jerry Wonder Duplessis and Wyclef Jean
Keyboards: Shea Taylor
"We've Got Tonight" (3:35)
Written by Robert Clark Seger
"Feel The Rain" (3:23)
Written by Tom Jones, Wyclef Jean and Jerry Wonder Duplessis
Backing vocals: Governor Washington
"I (Who Have Nothing)" (3:43)
Written by C. Donida, Mogol, J. Leiber, M. Stoller

Charts

See also
Tom Jones discography

References

External links
Mr. Jones at Discogs
[ Mr. Jones] at AllMusic

2002 albums
Tom Jones (singer) albums
V2 Records albums
Albums produced by Jerry Duplessis
Albums produced by Wyclef Jean